Taylor Noelle Watson (born April 6, 1993), better known by her stage name Tay Money, is an American rapper. She started her career in 2017, and gained fame after the release of her single "Trappers Delight" in June 2018.

Watson then released her debut EP, DUH!. Her debut mixtape, Hurricane Tay was released in March 2019, the following year she released her single, "Bussin" which became a viral sensation on video sharing network TikTok. It reached #41 on the U.S. Viral 50. In 2021, she signed a record deal with Geffen Records and Interscope Records.

Biography
Taylor Noelle Watson was born in Tyler, Texas on April 6, 1993, she later moved to Dallas. Watson worked as a hair stylist.

Watson made her debut with the single "Lewis & Clark" in 2017, she later released the single "Na Na". Her breakthrough came with the 2018 single "Trapper's Delight", which was released on WorldStarHipHop's YouTube channel. The music video received over 1.2 million views in less than a month. She released her debut EP, DUH!, on November of that year.

In 2019, she released the singles "High School", "2k" , "Ride Around", and "IMAX". In that same year, her debut mixtape, Hurricane Tay, was released with 16 tracks and two features from DaBaby and YNW Melly. In March 2020, Watson released her viral single "Bussin", which has gained widespread attention in social media, especially on the video sharing platform TikTok. In July 2020, Watson released "Bussins remix, titled "Bussin 2.0" with rapper Saweetie. On October 2, 2020, Watson released the music video for "Circus", which was directed by DrewFilmedIt. She released her debut mixtape, Blockedt, on December 11 of that year. It features Saweetie on the remix "Bussin 2.0" and Mulatto on "Brat", which was released on October.

In 2021, Watson signed a record deal with Geffen Records and Interscope Records. She also announced working on her debut studio album.

Media 
Watson was featured on D Magazine's "10 North Texas Hip-Hop Artists to Watch in 2020" list.

Personal life 
Watson dated videographer Cole Bennett. Their relationship ended in mid-2021.

References 

Living people
21st-century American rappers
21st-century American women musicians
American women rappers
1993 births
American hip hop musicians
People from Tyler, Texas
21st-century women rappers